Carmen Montón Giménez (born 9 March 1976) is a Spanish politician currently serving as Permanent Observer Ambassador of Spain to the Organization of American States.

A member of the Spanish Socialist Workers' Party (PSOE), she served as Minister of Health, Consumer Affairs and Social Welfare under Pedro Sánchez and as Head of the Department of Universal Health and Public Health of the Valencian government under Ximo Puig.

Biography and career

Politics in Valencia and Congress of Deputies 
Born on 9 March 1976 in Burjassot, Montón is married with one child, and studied medicine and became involved in the youth wing of the PSOE. She entered active politics in 1999 when she was elected a councillor for her home town of Burjassot to the immediate north-west of Valencia city. She resigned from the council in 2004 when she was elected to the Congress of Deputies as a deputy for Valencia, being re-elected in 2008. She was regional counselor of Health of the Community of Valencia between 2015 and 2018.

Her activity in Congress in her first year was centred on legislative preparation for laws legalising marriage between two people of the same gender. She has also spoken in favour of efforts to reduce domestic violence, including the creation of a telephone line to help males of a violent disposition, and for new laws to allow pregnant deputies to cast votes from outside the Spanish Congress.

Minister of Health and resignation 
She was chosen by Pedro Sánchez, new Spanish Prime Minister, following the motion of censure that the PSOE presented against the previous government of Mariano Rajoy (PP) and that was approved by the Congress of Deputies on 1 June 2018, appointed her as Minister in new Spanish government. Felipe VI sanctioned by royal decree of June her appointment as holder of the portfolio of Minister of Health, Consumer Affairs and Social Welfare. On 7 June she took office as Minister before the King at Palace of Zarzuela.

As Minister of Health, Consumer Affairs and Social Welfare in 2018, her policies were based in recovering health and social rights. Some of the main ones are the recovery of the access for every women to assisted reproduction techniques in the public health system and the creation of the Observatory of Women's Health. In addition, she worked on the defense of children's rights as well as starting projects for the prevention and management of suicidal behaviors.

As head of Department of Universal Health and Public Health of the Valencian government from 2015 to 2018), her policies focused on public health, recovery of rights and management efficiency. Under her management, Ms. Montón reversed a privatised hospital to the public system, recovered universal health access and eliminated pharmaceutical and orthoprothesic copayments. Furthermore, she guaranteed the treatment for all the patients of hepatitis C and implemented policies that helped the Valencian transplant system to become the most successful in Spain. She improved the kidney failure care system as well as developing the plan to treat diabetes in the Valencian Community. She is responsible for the creation of the Emergency and Urgent care plan in rural and isolated areas.

Moreover, she created the First Plan of Equality in the Valencian public health system and was also the first one to create a suicide prevention protocol. Other of the policies that she put in place were the Plans for Efficiency Improvement, Organization of Human Resources and the Dignification of Health Structures.

In her short term as Health Minister, she managed to restore the right to universal health care for all Spanish citizens and foreign residents in Spain (the previous government had excluded access to the Spanish National Health System for irregular migrants).

Permanent Observer to the OAS 
In March 2020, the government appointed her as the new Permanent Observer Ambassador of Spain to the Organization of American States.

References

 Biography at Spanish Congress website
 Personal blog

|-

1976 births
21st-century Spanish women politicians
Government ministers of Spain
Health ministers of Spain
Health ministers of the Valencian Community
Living people
Members of the 8th Congress of Deputies (Spain)
Members of the 9th Congress of Deputies (Spain)
People from Burjassot
Spanish Socialist Workers' Party politicians
Politicians from the Valencian Community
People involved in plagiarism controversies